Jean Baudrillard (27 July 1929 – 6 March 2007) was a French sociologist, philosopher and poet with interest in cultural studies. He is best known for his analyses of media, contemporary culture, and technological communication, as well as his formulation of concepts such as hyperreality. Baudrillard wrote about diverse subjects, including consumerism, critique of economy, social history, aesthetics, Western foreign policy, and popular culture. Among his most well-known works are Seduction (1978), Simulacra and Simulation (1981), America (1986), and The Gulf War Did Not Take Place (1991). His work is frequently associated with postmodernism and specifically post-structuralism. Nevertheless, Baudrillard has also opposed post-structuralism and had distanced himself from postmodernism.

Biography
Baudrillard was born in Reims, northeastern France, on 27 July 1929. His grandparents were farm workers and his father a gendarme. During high school (at the Lycée at Reims), he became aware of pataphysics via philosophy professor Emmanuel Peillet, which is said to be crucial for understanding Baudrillard's later thought. He became the first of his family to attend university when he moved to Paris to attend the Sorbonne. There he studied German language and literature, which led him to begin teaching the subject at several different lycées, both Parisian and provincial, from 1960 until 1966.

During career as teacher
While teaching, Baudrillard began to publish reviews of literature and translated the works of such authors as Peter Weiss, Bertolt Brecht, Karl Marx, Friedrich Engels, and Wilhelm Emil Mühlmann.

While teaching German, Baudrillard began to transfer to sociology, eventually completing and publishing in 1968 his doctoral thesis Le Système des Objets (The System of Objects) under the dissertation committee of Henri Lefebvre, Roland Barthes, and Pierre Bourdieu. Subsequently, he began teaching Sociology at the Paris X Nanterre, a university campus just outside Paris which would become heavily involved in the events of May 1968. During this time, Baudrillard worked closely with Philosopher Humphrey De Battenburge, who described Baudrillard as a "visionary". At Nanterre he took up a position as Maître Assistant (Assistant Professor), then Maître de Conférences (Associate Professor), eventually becoming a professor after completing his accreditation, L'Autre par lui-même (The Other by Himself).

In 1970, Baudrillard made the first of his many trips to the United States (Aspen, Colorado), and in 1973, the first of several trips to Kyoto, Japan. He was given his first camera in 1981 in Japan, which led to him becoming a photographer.

In 1986 he moved to IRIS (Institut de Recherche et d'Information Socio-Économique) at the Université de Paris-IX Dauphine, where he spent the latter part of his teaching career. During this time he had begun to move away from sociology as a discipline (particularly in its "classical" form), and, after ceasing to teach full-time, he rarely identified himself with any particular discipline, although he remained linked to academia. During the 1980s and 1990s his books had gained a wide audience, and in his last years he became, to an extent, an intellectual celebrity, being published often in the French- and English-speaking popular press. He nonetheless continued supporting the Institut de Recherche sur l'Innovation Sociale at the Centre National de la Recherche Scientifique and was Satrap at the Collège de Pataphysique. Baudrillard taught at the European Graduate School in Saas-Fee, Switzerland, and collaborated at the Canadian theory, culture, and technology review Ctheory, where he was abundantly cited. He also purportedly participated in the International Journal of Baudrillard Studies (as of 2022 hosted on Bishop's University domain) from its inception in 2004 until his death. 

In 1999–2000, his photographs were exhibited at the Maison européenne de la photographie in Paris. In 2004, Baudrillard attended the major conference on his work, "Baudrillard and the Arts", at the Center for Art and Media Karlsruhe in Karlsruhe, Germany.

Personal life 

Baudrillard enjoyed baroque music; a favorite composer was Claudio Monteverdi. He also favored rock music such as The Velvet Underground & Nico.

Baudrillard did his writing using "his old typewriter, never at the computer". He has stated that a computer is not "merely a handier and more complex kind of typewriter", whereas with a typewriter he has a "physical relation to writing".

Baudrillard was married twice. He and his first wife Lucile Baudrillard had two children, Gilles and Anne.

In 1970 during his first marriage, Baudrillard met 25-year-old Marine Dupuis when she arrived at the Nanterre where he was a professor. Marine went on to be a media artistic director. They married in 1994 when he was 65.

Diagnosed with cancer in 2005, Baudrillard battled the disease for two years from his apartment on Rue Sainte-Beuve, Paris, dying at the age of 77. Marine Baudrillard curates Cool Memories, an association of Jean Baudrillard's friends.

Key concepts

Baudrillard's published work emerged as part of a generation of French thinkers including: Gilles Deleuze, Jean-François Lyotard, Michel Foucault, Jacques Derrida, and Jacques Lacan who all shared an interest in semiotics, and he is often seen as a part of the post-structuralist philosophical school. 

James M. Russell in 2015 stated that "Baudrillard In common with many post-structuralists, his arguments consistently draw upon the notion that signification and meaning are both only understandable in terms of how particular words or "signs" interrelate. Baudrillard thought, as do many post-structuralists, that meaning is brought about through systems of signs working together. Following on from the structuralist linguist Ferdinand de Saussure, Baudrillard argued that meaning (value) is created through difference—through what something is not (so "dog" means "dog" because it is not-"cat", not-"goat", not-"tree", etc.). In fact, he viewed meaning as near enough self-referential: objects, images of objects, words and signs are situated in a web of meaning; one object's meaning is only understandable through its relation to the meaning of other objects; for instance, one thing's prestige relates to another's mundanity.

From this starting point Baudrillard theorized broadly about human society based upon this kind of self-referentiality. His writing portrays societies always searching for a sense of meaning—or a "total" understanding of the world—that remains consistently elusive. In contrast to Post-structuralism (such as Michel Foucault), for whom the formations of knowledge emerge only as the result of relations of power, Baudrillard developed theories in which the excessive, fruitless search for total knowledge leads almost inevitably to a kind of delusion. In Baudrillard's view, the (human) subject may try to understand the (non-human) object, but because the object can only be understood according to what it signifies (and because the process of signification immediately involves a web of other signs from which it is distinguished) this never produces the desired results. The subject is, rather, seduced (in the original Latin sense) by the object. He argued therefore that, in the final analysis, a complete understanding of the minutiae of human life is impossible, and when people are seduced into thinking otherwise they become drawn toward a "simulated" version of reality, or, to use one of his neologisms, a state of "hyperreality." This is not to say that the world becomes unreal, but rather that the faster and more comprehensively societies begin to bring reality together into one supposedly coherent picture, the more insecure and unstable it looks and the more fearful societies become. Reality, in this sense, "dies out."

Russell states that Baudrillard argues that "in our present “global” society, technological communication has created an excessive proliferation of meaning. Because of this, meaning's self-referentiality has prompted, not a “global village,” but a world where meaning has been obliterated"
Accordingly, Baudrillard argued that the excess of signs and of meaning in late 20th century "global" society had caused (quite paradoxically) an effacement of reality. In this world neither liberal nor Marxist utopias are any longer believed in. We live, he argued, not in a "global village", to use Marshall McLuhan's phrase, but rather in a world that is ever more easily petrified by even the smallest event. Because the "global" world operates at the level of the exchange of signs and commodities, it becomes ever more blind to symbolic acts such as, for example, terrorism. In Baudrillard's work the symbolic realm (which he develops a perspective on through the anthropological work of Marcel Mauss and Georges Bataille) is seen as quite distinct from that of signs and signification. Signs can be exchanged like commodities; symbols, on the other hand, operate quite differently: they are exchanged, like gifts, sometimes violently as a form of potlatch. Baudrillard, particularly in his later work, saw the "global" society as without this "symbolic" element, and therefore symbolically (if not militarily) defenseless against acts such as the Rushdie Fatwa or, indeed, the September 11 terrorist attacks against the United States and its military and economic establishment.

The object value system

At this time Baudrillard's political outlook was loosely associated with Marxism (and Situationism), but in these books he differed from Karl Marx in one significant way. For Baudrillard, as for the situationists, it was consumption rather than production that was the main driver of capitalist society.

Baudrillard came to this conclusion by criticising Marx's concept of "use-value." Baudrillard thought that both Marx's and Adam Smith's economic thought accepted the idea of genuine needs relating to genuine uses too easily and too simply. Baudrillard argued, drawing from Georges Bataille, that needs are constructed, rather than innate. He stressed that all purchases, because they always signify something socially, have their fetishistic side. Objects always, drawing from Roland Barthes, "say something" about their users. And this was, for him, why consumption was and remains more important than production: because the "ideological genesis of needs" precedes the production of goods to meet those needs.

He wrote that there are four ways of an object obtaining value. The four value-making processes are:

 The functional value: an object's instrumental purpose (use value). Example: a pen writes; a refrigerator cools.
 The exchange value: an object's economic value. Example: One pen may be worth three pencils, while one refrigerator may be worth the salary earned by three months of work.
 The symbolic value: an object's value assigned by a subject in relation to another subject (i.e., between a giver and receiver). Example: a pen might symbolize a student's school graduation gift or a commencement speaker's gift; or a diamond may be a symbol of publicly declared marital love.
 The sign value: an object's value within a system of objects. Example: a particular pen may, while having no added functional benefit, signify prestige relative to another pen; a diamond ring may have no function at all, but may suggest particular social values, such as taste or class.

Baudrillard's earlier books were attempts to argue that the first two of these values are not simply associated, but are disrupted by the third and, particularly, the fourth. Later, Baudrillard rejected Marxism totally (The Mirror of Production and Symbolic Exchange and Death). But the focus on the difference between sign value (which relates to commodity exchange) and symbolic value (which relates to Maussian gift exchange) remained in his work up until his death. Indeed, it came to play a more and more important role, particularly in his writings on world events.

Simulacra and Simulation

As Baudrillard developed his work throughout the 1980s, he moved from economic theory to mediation and mass communication. Although retaining his interest in Saussurean semiotics and the logic of symbolic exchange (as influenced by anthropologist Marcel Mauss), Baudrillard turned his attention to the work of Marshall McLuhan, developing ideas about how the nature of social relations is determined by the forms of communication that a society employs. In so doing, Baudrillard progressed beyond both Saussure's and Roland Barthes's formal semiology to consider the implications of a historically understood version of structural semiology. According to Kornelije Kvas, "Baudrillard rejects the structuralist principle of the equivalence of different forms of linguistic organization, the binary principle that contains oppositions such as: true-false, real-unreal, center-periphery. He denies any possibility of a (mimetic) duplication of reality; reality mediated through language becomes a game of signs. In his theoretical system all distinctions between the real and the fictional, between a copy and the original, disappear".

Simulation, Baudrillard claims, is the current stage of the simulacrum: all is composed of references with no referents, a hyperreality. Baudrillard argues that this is part of a historical progression. In the Renaissance, the dominant simulacrum was in the form of the counterfeit, where people or objects appear to stand for a real referent that does not exist (for instance, royalty, nobility, holiness, etc.). With the Industrial Revolution, the dominant simulacrum becomes the product, which can be propagated on an endless production line. In current times, the dominant simulacrum is the model, which by its nature already stands for endless reproducibility, and is itself already reproduced.

The end of history and meaning
Throughout the 1980s and 1990s, one of Baudrillard's most common themes was historicity, or, more specifically, how present-day societies use the notions of progress and modernity in their political choices. He argued, much like the political theorist Francis Fukuyama, that history had ended or "vanished" with the spread of globalization; but, unlike Fukuyama, Baudrillard averred that this end should not be understood as the culmination of history's progress, but as the collapse of the very idea of historical progress. For Baudrillard, the end of the Cold War did not represent an ideological victory; rather, it signaled the disappearance of utopian visions shared between both the political Right and Left. Giving further evidence of his opposition toward Marxist visions of global communism and liberal visions of global civil society, Baudrillard contended that the ends they hoped for had always been illusions; indeed, as The Illusion of the End argues, he thought the idea of an end itself was nothing more than a misguided dream:

Within a society subject to and ruled by fast-paced electronic communication and global information networks the collapse of this façade was always going to be, he thought, inevitable. Employing a quasi-scientific vocabulary that attracted the ire of the physicist Alan Sokal, Baudrillard wrote that the speed society moved at had destabilized the linearity of history: "we have the particle accelerator that has smashed the referential orbit of things once and for all."

Russell stated that this "approach to history demonstrates Baudrillard's affinities with the postmodern philosophy of Jean-François Lyotard", who argued that in the late 20th century there was no longer any room for "metanarratives." (The triumph of a coming communism being one such metanarrative.) But, in addition to simply lamenting this collapse of history, Baudrillard also went beyond Lyotard and attempted to analyse how the idea of positive progress was being employed in spite of the notion's declining validity. Baudrillard argued that although genuine belief in a universal endpoint of history, wherein all conflicts would find their resolution, had been deemed redundant, universality was still a notion used in world politics as an excuse for actions. Universal values which, according to him, no one any longer believed universal were and are still rhetorically employed to justify otherwise unjustifiable choices. The means, he wrote, are there even though the ends are no longer believed in, and are employed to hide the present's harsh realities (or, as he would have put it, unrealities). "In the Enlightenment, universalization was viewed as unlimited growth and forward progress. Today, by contrast, universalization is expressed as a forward escape." This involves the notion of "escape velocity" as outlined in The Illusion of the End , which in turn, results in the postmodern fallacy of escape velocity on which the postmodern mind and critical view cannot, by definition, ever truly break free from the all-encompassing "self-referential" sphere of discourse.

Hyperreality

Political commentary

On the Bosnian War
Baudrillard reacted to the West's indifference to the Bosnian War in writings, mostly in essays in his column for Libération. More specifically, he expressed his view on Europe's unwillingness to respond to "aggression and genocide in Bosnia," in which "New Europe" revealed itself to be a "sham." He criticized the Western media and intellectuals for their passivity, and for taking the role of bystanders, engaging in ineffective, hypocritical and self-serving action, and the public for its inability to distinguish simulacra from real world happenings, in which real death and destruction in Bosnia seemed unreal. He was determined in his columns to openly name the perpetrators, Serbs, and call their actions in Bosnia aggression and genocide.

Baudrillard "had famously attacked Susan Sontag" for directing a play in war-torn Bosnia.

On the Persian Gulf War
Baudrillard's provocative 1991 book, The Gulf War Did Not Take Place, raised his public profile as an academic and political commentator. He argued that the first Gulf War was the inverse of the Clausewitzian formula: not "the continuation of politics by other means," but "the continuation of the absence of politics by other means." Accordingly, Saddam Hussein was not fighting the Coalition, but using the lives of his soldiers as a form of sacrifice to preserve his power. The Coalition fighting the Iraqi military was merely dropping 10,000 tonnes of bombs daily, as if proving to themselves that there was an enemy to fight. So, too, were the Western media complicit, presenting the war in real time, by recycling images of war to propagate the notion that the U.S.-led Coalition and the Iraqi government were actually fighting, but, such was not the case. Saddam Hussein did not use his military capacity (the Iraqi Air Force). His power was not weakened, evinced by his easy suppression of the 1991 internal uprisings that followed afterwards. Over all, little had changed. Saddam remained undefeated, the "victors" were not victorious, and thus there was no war—i.e., the Gulf War did not occur.

The book was originally a series of articles in the British newspaper The Guardian and the French newspaper Libération, published in three parts: "The Gulf War Will Not Take Place," published during the American military and rhetorical buildup; "The Gulf War Is Not Taking Place," published during military action; and "The Gulf War Did Not Take Place" published afterwards.

Some critics, like Christopher Norris accused Baudrillard of instant revisionism; a denial of the physical action of the conflict (which was related to his denial of reality in general). Consequently, Baudrillard was accused of lazy amoralism, cynical scepticism, and Berkelian subjective idealism. Sympathetic commentators such as William Merrin, in his book Baudrillard and the Media, have argued that Baudrillard was more concerned with the West's technological and political dominance and the globalization of its commercial interests, and what that means for the present possibility of war. Merrin argued that Baudrillard was not denying that something had happened, but merely questioning whether that something was in fact war or a bilateral "atrocity masquerading as a war." Merrin viewed the accusations of amorality as redundant and based on a misreading. In Baudrillard's own words:

On the terrorist attacks of 11 September 2001
In his essay, "The Spirit of Terrorism," Baudrillard characterises the terrorist attacks of 11 September 2001 on the World Trade Center in New York City as the "absolute event." Baudrillard contrasts the "absolute event" of 11 September 2001 with "global events," such as the death of Diana, Princess of Wales and World Cup. The essay culminates in Baudrillard regarding the U.S.-led Gulf War as a "non-event," or an "event that did not happen." Seeking to understand them as a reaction to the technological and political expansion of capitalist globalization, rather than as a war of religiously based or civilization-based warfare, he described the absolute event and its consequences as follows:

In accordance with his theory of society, Baudrillard portrayed the attacks as a symbolic reaction to the inexorable rise of a world based on commodity exchange.

Debate with Jacques Derrida
19 February 2003, with the 2003 invasion of Iraq impending,  moderated a debate entitled "Pourquoi La Guerre Aujourd’hui?" between Baudrillard and Jacques Derrida, co-hosted by Major's Institute for Advanced Studies in Psychoanalysis and Le Monde Diplomatique. The debate discussed the relation between terrorist attacks and the invasion. University of Oklahoma professor Vincent Leitch states that "Where Baudrillard situates 9/11 as the primary motivating force" behind the Iraq War, whereas "Derrida argues that the Iraq War was planned long before 9/11, and that 9/11 plays a secondary role".

The Agony of Power

During 2005, Baudrillard wrote three short pieces and gave a brief magazine interview, all treating similar ideas; following his death in 2007, the four pieces were collected and published posthumously as The Agony of Power, a polemic against power itself. The first piece, "From Domination to Hegemony", contrasts its two subjects, modes of power; domination stands for historical, traditional power relations, while hegemony stands for modern, more sophisticated power relations as realized by states and businesses. Baudrillard decried the "cynicism" with which contemporary businesses openly state their business models. For example, he cited French television channel TF1 executive Patrick Le Lay who stated that his business' job was "to help Coca-Cola sell its products." Baudrillard lamented that such honesty pre-empted and thus robbed the Left of its traditional role of critiquing governments and businesses: "In fact, Le Lay takes away the only power we had left. He steals our denunciation." Consequently, Baudrillard stated that "power itself must be abolished—and not solely in the refusal to be dominated…but also, just as violently, in the refusal to dominate."

The latter pieces included further analysis of the 11 September terrorist attacks, using the metaphor of the Native American potlatch to describe both American and Muslim societies, specifically the American state versus the hijackers. In the pieces' context, "potlatch" referred not to the gift-giving aspect of the ritual, but rather its wealth-destroying aspect: "The terrorists' potlatch against the West is their own death. Our potlatch is indignity, immodesty, obscenity, degradation and abjection." This criticism of the West carried notes of Baudrillard's simulacrum, the above cynicism of business, and contrast between Muslim and Western societies:We [the West] throw this indifference and abjection at others like a challenge: the challenge to defile themselves in return, to deny their values, to strip naked, confess, admit—to respond to a nihilism equal to our own.

Reception
Lotringer notes that Gilles Deleuze, "otherwise known for his generosity", "made it known around Paris" that he saw Baudrillard as "the shame of the profession" after Baudrillard published his views on Foucault's works.

Sontag, responding to Baudrillard's comments on her reactions to the Bosnian war, described him as "ignorant and cynical" and "a political idiot".

James M. Russell in 2015 wrote that "The most severe" of Baudrillard's "critics accuse him of being a purveyor of a form of reality-denying irrationalism".
One of Baudrillard's editors, critical theory professor Mark Poster, remarked:

But Poster still argued for his contemporary relevance; he also attempted to refute the most extreme of Baudrillard's critics:

Christopher Norris's Uncritical Theory: Postmodernism, Intellectuals and the Gulf War, to Russell, "seeks to reject his media theory and position on "the real" out of hand".

Frankfurt school critical theorist Douglas Kellner's Jean Baudrillard: From Marxism to Postmodernism and Beyond—seeks rather to analyse Baudrillard's relation to postmodernism (a concept with which Baudrillard has had a continued, if uneasy and rarely explicit, relationship) and to present a Marxist counter. Regarding the former, William Merrin (discussed above) published more than one denunciation of Norris' position. The latter Baudrillard himself characterised as reductive.

Kellner stated that "it is difficult to decide whether Baudrillard is best read as science fiction and pataphysics, or as philosophy, social theory, and cultural metaphysics, and whether his post-1970s work should be read under the sign of truth or fiction." To Kellner, Baudrillard during and after the 1970s "falls prey to a technological determinism and semiological idealism which posits an autonomous technology".

Kellner commented that Baudrillard's views were 'ultra-leftist' in his writing of Symbolic Exchange and Death. Baudrillard later admitted that his views could be classified as right-wing "in objective terms", but found the Left–right political spectrum arbitrary.

Art critic Adrian Searle in 1998 described Baudrillard's photography as "wistful, elegaic and oddly haunting", like "movie stills of unregarded moments".

Tone and attitude
Mark Fisher pointed out that Baudrillard "is condemned, sometimes lionised, as the melancholic observer of a departed reality", asserting that Baudrillard "was certainly melancholic". Poster stated that "As the politics of the sixties receded so did Baudrillard's radicalism: from a position of firm leftism he gradually moved to one of bleak fatalism", a view Felix Guattari echoed. Richard G. Smith, David B. Clarke and Marcus A. Doel instead consider Baudrillard "an extreme optimist". In an exchange between critical theorist McKenzie Wark and EGS professor Geert Lovink, Wark remarked of Baudrillard that "Everything he wrote was marked by a radical sadness and yet invariably expressed in the happiest of forms." Baudrillard himself stated "we have to fight against charges of unreality, lack of responsibility, nihilism, and despair". Chris Turner's English translation of Baudrillard's Cool Memories: 1980–1985 writes, "I accuse myself of... being profoundly carnal and melancholy...AMEN ".

David Macey saw "extraordinary arrogance" in Baudrillard's take on Foucault. Sontag found Baudrillard 'condescending'.

Russell wrote that "Baudrillard's writing, and his uncompromising - even arrogant - stance, have led to fierce criticism which in contemporary social scholarship can only be compared to the criticism received by Jacques Lacan."

Terrorism comments 
Baudrillard's stance on the 11 September 2001 attacks was criticised on two counts. Richard Wolin (in The Seduction of Unreason) forcefully accused Baudrillard and Slavoj Žižek of all but celebrating the terrorist attacks, essentially claiming that the United States received what it deserved. Žižek, however, countered that accusation to Wolin's analysis as a form of intellectual barbarism in the journal Critical Inquiry, saying that Wolin failed to see the difference between fantasising about an event and stating that one is deserving of that event. Merrin (in Baudrillard and the Media) argued that Baudrillard's position affords the terrorists a type of moral superiority. In the journal Economy and Society, Merrin further noted that Baudrillard gives the symbolic facets of society unfair privilege above semiotic concerns. Second, authors questioned whether the attacks were unavoidable. Bruno Latour, in Critical Inquiry, argued that Baudrillard believed that their destruction was forced by the society that created them, alluding to the notion that the Towers were "brought down by their own weight." In Latour's view, this was because Baudrillard conceived only of society in terms of a symbolic and semiotic dualism.

Native American (Anishinaabe) writer Gerald Vizenor made extensive use of Baudrillard's concepts of simulation in his critical work.

In popular culture

The Wachowskis said that Baudrillard influenced The Matrix (1999), and Neo hides money and disks containing information in Simulacra and Simulation. Adam Gopnik wondered whether Baudrillard, who had not embraced the movie, was "thinking of suing for a screen credit," but Baudrillard himself disclaimed any connection to The Matrix, calling it at best a misreading of his ideas.

Some reviewers have noted that Charlie Kaufman's film Synecdoche, New York seems inspired by Baudrillard's Simulacra and Simulation.

The album Why Hasn't Everything Already Disappeared? by rock band Deerhunter was influenced by Baudrillard's essay of the same name.

Bibliography

Books (English translations)

 1968. The System of Objects
 1970. 
 1972. For a Critique of the Political Economy of the Sign
 1973. The Mirror of Production
 1976. Symbolic Exchange and Death
 1977. Forget Foucault
 1979. Seduction
 1981. Simulacra and Simulation
 1982. In the Shadow of the Silent Majorities
 1983. Fatal Strategies
 1983. Simulations
 1986. America
 1987. Cool Memories 1980–1985
 1987. The Ecstasy of Communication
 1990. The Transparency of Evil
 1991. The Gulf War Did Not Take Place
 1992. The Illusion of the End
 1995. The Perfect Crime
 1996. Cool Memories II 1987–1990
 1997. Fragments: Cool Memories III 1990–1995
 1998. Paroxysm: Interviews with Philippe Petit
 1999. Impossible Exchange
 2000. Passwords
 2000. The Singular Objects of Architecture
 2000. The Vital Illusion
 2002. The Spirit of Terrorism And Requiem for the Twin Towers
 2003. Fragments (Interviews with François L'Yvonnet)
 2003. Cool Memories IV 1995–2000
 2005. The Intelligence of Evil or the Lucidity Pact
 2005. The Conspiracy of Art
 2006. Utopia Deferred: Writings for Utopie (1967–1978)
 2006. Cool Memories V 2000–2004
 2007. Exiles from Dialogue
 2008. Radical Alterity
 2009. Why Hasn't Everything Already Disappeared?
 2010. Carnival and Cannibal, or the Play of Global Antagonisms
 2010. The Agony of Power
 2011. Telemorphosis
 2014. Screened Out
 2014. The Divine Left: A Chronicle of the Years 1977–1984

Articles and essays

1996. "No Pity for Sarajevo; The West's Serbianization; When the West Stands In for the Dead." Pp. 79–89 in This Time We Knew: Western Responses to Genocide in Bosnia. NYU Press. .
2001. "The Spirit of Terrorism." Telos 121(Fall):134–42.
 2005. "Divine Europe." Telos 131(Summer):188–90.
 2006. "The Pyres of Autumn." New Left Review 2(37).
The violence of images, violence against the image.
 Radical Thought (CTheory) 
https://web.archive.org/web/20160513042009/http://ctheory.net/articles.aspx?id=67

Interviews
 Jocks, Heinz-Norbert: Die Fotografie und die Dinge. Ein Gespräch mit Jean Baudrillard. In: Kunstforum International., No: 172, Das Ende der Fotografie. Editor: Heinz-Norbert Jocks, 2004, p. 70–83.
 Smith, Richard G., David B. Clarke, eds. 2015. Jean Baudrillard: From Hyperreality to Disappearance: Uncollected Interviews. Edinburgh, UK: Edinburgh University Press. .
 Smith, Richard G., David B. Clarke, eds. 2017. Jean Baudrillard: The Disappearance of Culture: Uncollected Interviews. Edinburgh, UK: Edinburgh University Press. .

Audio CDs
 1997. Die Illusion des Endes – Das Ende der Illusion [58 minutes + booklet], Jean Baudrillard & Boris Groys. Cologne: supposé. 
 2006. Die Macht der Verführung, [55 minutes]. Cologne: supposé. .

See also

Notes

References

External links 

Jean Baudrillard Biography. Archived from the original on 20 December 2009. Faculty page at European Graduate School (biography, bibliography, photos and videos).

Jean Baudrillard (1981; translated 1994 by Sheila Glaser), Simulacra and Simulation, archived from the original on 21 May 2013.
Baudrillard; Cultura, Simulacro y régimen de mortandad en el Sistema de los Objetos | EIKASIA PDF (in Spanish) Adolfo Vásquez Rocca

International Journal of Baudrillard Studies. Retrieved 9 March 2022
Cool Memories, association of Baudrillard's friends
 Bacon's Essays/Of Simulation and Dissimulation by Anglican philosopher Francis Bacon
 Terror And Performance – Asymmetric Warfare, Martyrdom, And Necropolitics. An application of Achille Mbembe's study of Necropolitics to Baudrillard's notion of death.

 
1929 births
2007 deaths
20th-century French  economists
20th-century French essayists
20th-century French male writers
20th-century French philosophers
20th-century French historians
21st-century French essayists
21st-century French male writers
21st-century French philosophers
21st-century French economists
21st-century French historians
Accelerationism
Anti-consumerists
Aphorists
Architectural theoreticians
Architecture critics
Burials at Montparnasse Cemetery
Continental philosophers
Critical theorists
Critics of Marxism
Critics of political economy
Epistemologists
Academic staff of European Graduate School
French anti-capitalists
French architectural historians
French architecture writers
French art historians
French male essayists
French male non-fiction writers
French photographers
French social commentators
French sociologists
Hyperreality theorists
Mass media theorists
Media critics
Metaphilosophers
Metaphysicians
Ontologists
Pataphysicians
Writers from Reims
Philosophers of art
Philosophers of culture
Philosophers of death
Philosophers of economics
Philosophers of education
Philosophers of history
Philosophers of language

Philosophers of nihilism
Philosophers of psychology
Philosophers of science
Philosophers of social science
Philosophers of technology
Philosophers of war
Philosophy writers
Political philosophers
Social philosophers
Systems scientists
Terrorism studies
Theorists on Western civilization
University of Paris alumni
Writers about activism and social change
Writers about globalization
Writers about religion and science
20th-century French poets
21st-century French poets
French male poets